Rodwell Makoto (born 1987) is a Zimbabwean chess International Master.

He won the South African Open in 2012, and has featured for Zimbabwe in their Olympiad team. He became an International Master in 2013. With an elo rating of 2403 in June 2015, Makoto became Zimbabwe's second highest rated International Master after Robert Gwaze, who was rated at 2422 at the time.

He qualified for the Chess World Cup 2021, where he was defeated by Vladislav Kovalev in the first round.

References

External links

Rodwell Makoto games at 365Chess

Zimbabwean chess players
Chess International Masters
Living people
Alumni of Prince Edward School
Chess Olympiad competitors
1987 births
Competitors at the 2019 African Games
African Games medalists in chess
African Games bronze medalists for Zimbabwe